Chidanand Saraswati is the president and spiritual head of the Parmarth Niketan Ashram, a spiritual institution based in Rishikesh, India. He is also the founder and spiritual head of the Hindu Jain Temple in Pittsburgh.

Humanitarian and environmental work 
Chidanand Saraswati is the founder or co-founder of several humanitarian and environmental organizations which serve a number of causes, including: Ganga Action Parivar, to preserve and protect the Ganga river and its tributaries; India Heritage Research Foundation (IHRF), which provides education, health care, youth welfare, and vocational training; Divine Shakti Foundation, which provides education and assistance to widowed and impoverished women and children, as well as the protection of street animals in India such as cows and dogs; the Global Interfaith WASH Alliance (GIWA) to provide access to safe drinking water, improved sanitation and proper hygiene; and Project Hope, an umbrella organization that brings together various humanitarian and environmental organizations in times of disaster to provide both emergency relief and long-term rehabilitation.

References

External links

 

1952 births
Living people
20th-century Hindu religious leaders
People from Rishikesh